Moira is a village located southeast of Patras, Greece.  Moira had a population of 65 in 2011.  Moira was part of the municipality of Patras between 1845 and 1912, and again after 1997. Between 1912 and 1997, it was an independent community.

Geography

Moira is situated in the valley of the river Glafkos. The Panachaiko mountain lies to the northeast.

Population

External links
 Moira GTP Travel Pages

See also

List of settlements in Achaea

References

Patras
Populated places in Achaea